Puek Tian Beach is a beach of the Gulf of Thailand, located in Tambon  Puek Tian, Amphoe Tha Yang, Phetchaburi Province, western Thailand, about 21 km (13.5 mi) from City of Phetchaburi in the middle between Cha-am and Chao Samran Beaches.

Puek Tien Beach is a beach that is different from the other, where it is quiet and not very crowded. Highlights of this beach is the statue of the characters from Phra Aphai Mani, the masterpiece epic poem of Sunthon Phu such as Nang Phisuea Samudra (sea ogress), Nang Ngueak (mermaid) and main character Phra Aphai Mani, including other statues viz giant turtle and Chinese goddess Kuan Yin. 

Believed that he had traveled here when he was ordained and impressed therefore used this beach as the backdrop of story.

References

External links

Beaches of Thailand
Tourist attractions in Phetchaburi province